Lethedon is a genus of shrubs in the Thymelaeaceae family from Australia and New Caledonia.  It is related to Arnhemia, Deltaria, Gonystylus and Solmsia.

References

Octolepidoideae
Malvales genera